Mersin İdmanyurdu (also Mersin İdman Yurdu, Mersin İY, or MİY) Sports Club; located in Mersin, east Mediterranean coast of Turkey in 1972–73. The 1972–73 season was the sixth season of Mersin İdmanyurdu (MİY) football team in Turkish First Football League, the first level division in Turkey. They finished 11th in the league.

President was Mehmet Karamehmet. Vice president was Sezai Sak. General captain was Necati Bolkan. Governor of Mersin Bayram Turançetin gave a speech before the game played on December 25, 1972, against MKE Ankaragücü, inviting fans to support the team. Coach was Turgay Şeren. Şeren completed first half and resigned after a home lost against Eskişehirspor on 17th round. Nazım Koka replaced him.

In Turkish Cup the team was eliminated to Gaziantepspor at 2nd round.

Pre-season
 20.08.1972 - Kayserispor-MİY: 2-1.

1972–73 First League participation
First League was played with 16 teams in its 16th season, 1972–73. Last two teams relegated to Second League 1973–74. Mersin İY became 11th with 8 wins. Zeki Temizer was the most scorer player with 8 goals.
 Friendly game: 21.10.1972 - MİY-Guarani (BRA): 3-2. Saturday, 14:30. Tevfik Sırrı Gür Stadium, Mersin.

Results summary
Mersin İdmanyurdu (MİY) 1972–73 First League summary:

Sources: 1972–73 Turkish First Football League pages.

League table
Mersin İY's league performance in First League in 1972–73 season is shown in the following table.

Note: Won, drawn and lost points are 2, 1 and 0. F belongs to MİY and A belongs to corresponding team for both home and away matches.

Results by round
Results of games MİY played in 1972–73 First League by rounds:

First half

Second half

1972–73 Turkish Cup participation
1972–73  Turkish Cup was played for the 11th season as Türkiye Kupası by 26 teams. Two elimination rounds and finals were played in two-legs elimination system. Mersin İdmanyurdu participated in 1972–73  Turkish Cup from the first round and was eliminated at second round by Gaziantepspor. Gaziantepspor was eliminated at quarter-finals. Galatasaray won the Cup for the 5th time.

Cup track
The drawings and results Mersin İdmanyurdu (MİY) followed in 1972–73 Turkish Cup are shown in the following table.

Note: In the above table 'Score' shows For and Against goals whether the match played at home or not.

Game details
Mersin İdmanyurdu (MİY) 1972–73 Turkish Cup game reports is shown in the following table.
Kick off times are in EET and EEST.

Source: 1972–73 Turkish Cup pages.

Management

Club management
Mehmet Karamehmet was club president

Coaching team

1972–73 Mersin İdmanyurdu head coaches:

Note: Only official games were included.

1972–73 squad
Stats are counted for 1972–73 First League matches and 1972–73 Turkish Cup (Türkiye Kupası) matches. In the team rosters five substitutes were allowed to appear, two of whom were substitutable. Only the players who appeared in game rosters were included and listed in the order of appearance.

Sources: 1972–73 season squad data from maçkolik com, Milliyet, and Erbil (1975).

Transfer news from Milliyet:
 Before the season goalkeeper Yılmaz was transfreed from İstanbulspor. Defender Selahattin from Vefa. Necdet from Gençlerbirliği.
 Transfers out: B.Erol (free).

See also
 Football in Turkey
 1972–73 Turkish First Football League
 1972–73 Turkish Cup

Notes and references

Mersin İdman Yurdu seasons
Turkish football clubs 1972–73 season